Do-drul Chorten is a stupa in Gangtok in the Indian state of Sikkim. The stupa was built by Trulshik Rinpoche, head of the Nyingma order of Tibetan Buddhism in 1945. Inside this stupa is a complete set of Dorjee Phurba, Kangyur (Holy Books) and other religious objects. Around the stupa are 108 Mani Lhakor or prayer wheels. The stupa is surrounded by Chorten Lakahang and Guru Lakhang, where two statues of Guru Rinpoche are present.

Next to the Chorten is a monastery for young Lamas with a shrine containing huge images of Padmasambhava and his manifestation, Guru Snang – Sid Zilzon. It is located about 500 meters above the Namgyal Institute of Tibetology.

Stupas in India
Tourist attractions in Sikkim
Gangtok
Religious buildings and structures in Sikkim